Mount Joli is a small rocky mass with three summits, the highest to , on the northeast side of Petrel Island in the Géologie Archipelago. It was charted in 1951 by the French Antarctic Expedition and named by them for a summit of the Alps in the vicinity of Mont Blanc.

References

Mountains of Adélie Land